The UConn Huskies women's basketball statistical leaders are individual statistical leaders of the UConn Huskies women's basketball program in various categories, including points, three-pointers, assists, blocks, rebounds, and steals. Within those areas, the lists identify single-game, single-season, and career leaders. The Huskies represent the University of Connecticut in the NCAA Division I Big East Conference.

UConn began competing in intercollegiate women's basketball in 1974, before the NCAA governed women's sports; in that era, the main governing body for women's college sports was the Association of Intercollegiate Athletics for Women (AIAW). The NCAA began governing women's sports in the 1981–82 school year; after one year in which both the NCAA and AIAW held national championship events, the AIAW folded. Because of UConn's relatively recent history in women's basketball, there is no "pre-modern" era of limited statistics; full box scores are available for all UConn games, and the only rules change that seriously impacted statistical totals was the advent of the three-pointer, which was made mandatory in NCAA women's basketball in the 1987–88 season.

The NCAA has recorded individual scoring and rebounding totals since it began sponsoring women's sports championships. However, it did not officially record the other statistics included in this page until later. Assists were first officially recorded in women's basketball in the 1985–86 season. Blocks and steals were first officially recorded in 1987–88, the same season in which the use of the three-pointer was made mandatory. UConn only includes three-point statistics since the national adoption of that rule, and only began recording steals in 1978–79, but otherwise includes statistics from the entire history of UConn women's basketball. These lists are updated through the end of the 2020–21 season.

Scoring

Three-pointers

Rebounds

Assists

Steals
UConn did not begin recording steals until 1978, and lists only a top 5 in single-game steals instead of a top 10.

Blocks

References

Lists of college basketball statistical leaders by team
Statistical